Who Wants to Be a Millionaire: Canadian Edition was a Canadian game show based on the British format of Who Wants to Be a Millionaire? and taped on the set of ABC of the American version of that show. A Canadian audience was flown to New York City so the contestants could "ask the audience" for help on the Canadian-themed questions. Following the airing of the two specials, CTV did announce that additional episodes of the Canadian Edition would be produced, but they never came to fruition. The series was hosted by Pamela Wallin.

The Canadian version aired on CTV on September 13 and 14, 2000.

Gameplay

As in the United Kingdom and the United States, contestants tried to answer 15 multiple-choice questions to win CA$1,000,000 (US$797,802) with three lifelines (50:50, Phone-A-Friend, and Ask The Audience) to help them. Contestants were guaranteed $1,000 for correctly answering the fifth question, and $32,000 for the tenth.

Bill Shizas was the first contestant on the Canadian show. He won $1,000 after answering his $8,000 question incorrectly.

The biggest winner during the show's run was François Dominic Laramée, a writer from Verdun, Quebec. He won $64,000.

See also
International versions of Millionaire

References

Who Wants to Be a Millionaire?
2000s Canadian game shows
CTV Television Network original programming
2000 Canadian television series debuts
2000 Canadian television series endings
Television series by Bell Media
Television series by Sony Pictures Television
Television series by Disney–ABC Domestic Television